The Panjer recursion is an algorithm to compute the probability distribution approximation of a compound random variable

In more general cases the distribution of S is a compound distribution. The recursion for the special cases considered was introduced in a paper  by Harry Panjer (Distinguished Emeritus Professor, University of Waterloo). It is heavily used in actuarial science (see also systemic risk).

Preliminaries 
We are interested in the compound random variable  where  and  fulfill the following preconditions.

Claim size distribution 
Furthermore the  have to be distributed on a lattice  with latticewidth .

 

In actuarial practice,  is obtained by discretisation of the claim density function (upper, lower...).

Claim number distribution 

The number of claims N is a random variable, which is said to have a "claim number distribution", and which can take values 0, 1, 2, .... etc.. For the "Panjer recursion", the probability distribution of N has to be a member of the Panjer class, otherwise known as the (a,b,0) class of distributions. This class consists of all counting random variables which fulfill the following relation:

The initial value  is determined such that 

The Panjer recursion makes use of this iterative relationship to specify a recursive way of constructing the probability distribution of S.  In the following  denotes the probability generating function of N: for this see  the table in (a,b,0) class of distributions.

In the case of claim number is known, please note the De Pril algorithm. This algorithm is suitable to compute the sum distribution of  discrete random variables.

Recursion 

and

and proceed with

Example 
(See Fréchet distribution.)

As observed, an issue may arise at the initialization of the recursion. Guégan and Hassani (2009) have proposed a solution to deal with that issue
.

References

External links
Panjer recursion and the distributions it can be used with

Actuarial science
Compound probability distributions
Theory of probability distributions